The 2007 Kwara State gubernatorial election was the 6th gubernatorial election of Kwara State. Held on April 14, 2007, the People's Democratic Party nominee Bukola Saraki won the election, defeating Gbenga Olawepo-Hashim of the Democratic People's Party.

Results 
Bukola Saraki from the People's Democratic Party won the election, defeating Gbenga Olawepo-Hashim from the Democratic People's Party. Registered voters was 1,216,478.

References 

Kwara State gubernatorial elections
Kwara gubernatorial
April 2007 events in Nigeria